Jeremy Jaynes (born 1974) is currently an entrepreneur and business consultant living in Raleigh, North Carolina.  Jaynes is best known for some of his earliest online ventures that involved the act of e-mail spamming, broadcasting junk e-mail from his home in North Carolina, United States.  While he was ultimately acquitted, he was the first person in the world to be charged with "felony spam", i.e., sending spam without allegation of any accompanying illegal conduct such as theft, fraud, trespass, defamation, or obscenity.  

His acquittal was granted by the Virginia Supreme Court ruling unanimously the law Jaynes was prosecuted under violated the First Amendment. On March 30, 2009, the Supreme Court of the United States refused the Virginia Attorney General's petition for a writ of certiorari to review the decision of the Supreme Court of Virginia overturning the anti-spam statute. Jaynes never served any of his prison sentence for the overturned conviction.

Personal Life

Jeremy Jaynes attended high school in Baton Rouge, Louisiana.  His father was a professor of genetic engineering at Louisiana State University.  He currently lives and works just outside of Raleigh, North Carolina.  He is married with 3 children.

See also
 List of spammers

References

External links
 https://jeremyjaynes.com/
ALLIANCE NEWSLETTER - 2009 ISSUE 1 p. 10-11 (pdf, archived 03/19/2017)
 https://www.leclairryan.com/news/xprNewsDetail.aspx?xpST=NewsDetail&news=261 (09/17/2008, archived 03/19/2017)
 https://www.leclairryan.com/pubs/xprPubDetail.aspx?xpST=PubDetail&pub=492 (07/06/2009, archived 03/19/2017)
 https://www.leclairryan.com/news/xprNewsDetail.aspx?xpST=NewsDetail&news=239 (06/05/2008, archived 03/19/2017)
 http://www.richmond.com/news/va-high-court-revisits-spam-case/article_0e843ab9-917b-5b4e-be33-1c5df1e7c4d8.html (05/06/2008, seen 2017-03-19)

1974 births
Email spammers
Living people
People from Raleigh, North Carolina

fi:Jeremy Jaynes